Keijo Erik Rosberg (born 6 December 1948), known as "Keke", is a Finnish former racing driver and winner of the  Formula One World Championship. He was the first Finnish driver to compete regularly in the series, as well as the first Finnish champion. He is the father of 2016 Formula One World Champion Nico Rosberg.

Early life
Rosberg was born on 6 December 1948 in Solna, Sweden, where his father studied veterinary science. Rosberg's father Lars Rosberg and mother Lea Lautala were both natives of Hamina, Finland. The family moved back to Finland in the spring of 1950, originally settling in Lapinjärvi and later moving to Hamina, Oulu and Iisalmi.

Formula One career

Minor teams: 1978–1981

Rosberg had a relatively late start to his Formula One career, debuting at the age of 29 after stints in Formula Vee, Formula Super Vee, Can-Am, Formula Atlantic, Formula Pacific and Formula Two, then "feeder" series to Formula One. He raced for Fred Opert, his American patron.  His first Formula One drive was with the Theodore team during the 1978 season. He immediately caught the attention of the Formula One paddock with a superb drive in the non-Championship BRDC International Trophy at Silverstone in just his second race with the team, emerging victorious after many of the big names had been caught out by a tremendous downpour. Rosberg was not able to qualify for a race afterwards, and was signed by another uncompetitive team, ATS, for three races after the Theodore team scrapped its unreliable car design. He returned to Theodore after they acquired chassis from the Wolf Formula One team, but these were also uncompetitive and Rosberg returned to ATS to end the season.

He next emerged with the Wolf team, midway through the 1979 season. However, the team was having difficulty staying solvent, and Rosberg had problems in finishing races. Rosberg soon had to change teams again when Wolf left Formula One, and signed with Fittipaldi Automotive which had bought the remains of Walter Wolf's squad. He secured his first two point-scoring results in the 1980 season, including a sensational podium at the season-opening race at Buenos Aires, but the uncompetitiveness of the Fittipaldi car meant that Rosberg often failed to finish or qualify. 1981 was worse as he failed to score at all.

The sharp end – Williams: 1982–1985

Despite this, Williams was interested in Rosberg, with the retirement of  World Champion Alan Jones leaving a seat open for the 1982 season. Given a competitive car, Rosberg had a highly successful year. He consistently scored points and earned his first victory in the Swiss Grand Prix at Dijon-Prenois late that year (despite being called the "Swiss Grand Prix", the race was held in France due to Switzerland's ban on motor racing in effect since the 1955 Le Mans disaster).

In a year where no driver won more than two races, with Ferrari's season marred by the death of Gilles Villeneuve at Zolder and the career-ending injuries to Didier Pironi at Hockenheim, and the turbocharged Brabham-BMW and Renault cars suffering from poor reliability (and not helped by Brabham continually changing between the Ford V8 and the BMW turbo), consistency won Rosberg the Drivers' Championship. This was despite his Williams FW07C using the normally-aspirated Ford DFY V8 engine which was considered outdated and out-matched against the vastly more powerful turbo cars. Rosberg won the championship with a five-point lead over Pironi, who had missed the last four races of the season due to injuries sustained at the German Grand Prix. To celebrate the victory, Frank Williams gave Rosberg two days off from testing and allowed him to smoke in the team mobile home. As a result of winning just one race in his title winning season Rosberg equalled the record set by Mike Hawthorn in 1958  for the fewest number wins scored by a driver during a World Championship winning season, a record he still jointly holds with Hawthorn as of 2023.

Rosberg's post-championship years would be hamstrung by both uncompetitive chassis from Williams, and the powerful but unreliable Honda turbo engine. However, by this time, the reliability of the Ferrari, Renault and BMW turbo engines was starting to match their speed and power output. Rosberg still put his Williams FW08 on pole for the opening race of the season in Brazil (where he was disqualified from 2nd place because he was push started in the pits after he was forced to abandon his car in his pit bay due to a fuel vapor fire), and then won both the non-championship Race of Champions at Brands Hatch and in Monaco thanks to a choice of slicks at the start when all others started on wets, but it was increasingly obvious that without a turbocharged engine, results would be scarce. To that end, Frank Williams concluded a deal to run the Honda V6 turbo engine in his cars. Honda had come back into Formula One that year with the Spirit team and results had been slow with unreliability, but they were enthusiastic about joining Williams who had a reputation as a Championship-winning team. Rosberg and teammate Jacques Laffite first got their Honda turbos in the season ending South African Grand Prix at Kyalami and immediately the new Williams FW09 was on the pace. Rosberg finished in 5th place to give him 5th place in the championship.

Despite the powerful Honda engines, Williams and Rosberg struggled in  mostly due to the FW09B chassis not being rigid enough to handle the power delivery of the  V6. The Finn managed to tame both the car and engine long enough to win the Dallas Grand Prix, but his only other podium for the year was a second at the season opener in Brazil (the third time in succession he finished second in Brazil, but the only one from which he was not disqualified). After a frustrating year he finished the championship in eighth place with 20.5 points.

In November 1984 following the Formula One season, Rosberg, along with fellow Formula One drivers Niki Lauda (the 1984 World Champion), Andrea de Cesaris and François Hesnault, travelled to Australia for the non-championship 1984 Australian Grand Prix at the Calder Park Raceway in Melbourne. Rosberg managed to qualify 4th in his Ralt RT4 Ford despite spending most of the day with fellow aviation enthusiast Lauda (his teammate for the race) attending an air show at the nearby Essendon Airport. After an early race dice with Lauda and a clash with Terry Ryan while lapping the young Australian which put him off the short 1.609 km (1.000 mi) circuit, Rosberg went on to finish 2nd behind the Ralt RT4 Ford of Brazilian driver Roberto Moreno who won his 3rd Australian Grand Prix in 4 years (having also won in 1981 and 1983).

 would prove better for both Rosberg and Williams. The Finn had a new teammate in Nigel Mansell and the all carbon fibre Williams FW10 chassis was a big improvement over the FW09B. For the first few races the team used the 1984 engines until Honda introduced an upgraded version which improved power delivery, fuel economy and most importantly, reliability. Rosberg used the new engine to good effect, winning the Detroit Grand Prix and claiming pole in the next two races in France at the Paul Ricard Circuit and the British Grand Prix at Silverstone. Rosberg's pole-winning lap at Silverstone created history when he lapped the 4.719 km (2.932 mi) circuit in 1:05.591 for an average speed of 259.01 km/h (160.94 mph). This would remain the single fastest lap of a circuit in Formula One until broken by Williams driver Juan Pablo Montoya at the 2002 Italian Grand Prix at Monza.

Keke Rosberg's fifth and final Grand Prix victory came at the 1985 Australian Grand Prix on the brand new Adelaide Street Circuit. As it was the final race of the season, it was also Rosberg's final race for Williams. Keke gave the winners trophy to his race engineer, Frank Dernie. The win enhanced Rosberg's reputation as a street circuit specialist, as four of his five championship Grand Prix wins (Monaco, Dallas, Detroit and Adelaide) had come on street circuits. Rosberg handled the 35°C heat better than most and won by 43 seconds from the Ligier Renaults of Jacques Laffite and Philippe Streiff.

Just as the Honda engine began producing regular results, Rosberg decided to leave Williams at the end of 1985 and signed for McLaren, winners of the 1984 and 1985 Drivers' and Constructors' championships.

The final year – McLaren: 1986
At the time, Rosberg's move to McLaren for the 1986 season had seemed a master stroke as they were the championship team of the previous two seasons, having done so (especially in 1984) in dominating fashion. However, the 1986 McLaren was now somewhat underpowered compared to its rivals, and Rosberg, was soundly beaten by teammate, 1985 World Champion Alain Prost (the McLaren MP4/2C had been designed by John Barnard to suit the smoother style of Niki Lauda and Alain Prost, while Rosberg had never shed the ground effects style of late braking and throwing the car into a corner. It was not until it became known Barnard was leaving for Ferrari that the designer allowed Rosberg to fundamentally change his cars set up to suit his style. Ironically this coincided with Rosberg's only pole position of the season in Germany). On top of that, the fatal crash of Rosberg's close friend Elio de Angelis while testing a Brabham at the Paul Ricard circuit in France in May 1986 deeply affected him and he retired at the end of the season. He would later claim that he retired "too soon" .

Keke Rosberg dominated the final race of his Formula One career, the 1986 Australian Grand Prix, though he did not win. While holding a 30-second lead over Nelson Piquet (his replacement at Williams), he had a rear tyre let go on lap 62. Thinking the noise from the back of his McLaren was engine related, he shut the engine off and pulled off the circuit, only to find when he got out and checked that all he needed to do was drive back to the pits to change tyres. However, he later revealed that he would never have won anyway, that he planned to give best to Alain Prost in the Frenchman's bid for back-to-back World Championships (Prost needed to win the race with Nigel Mansell finishing no better than 4th to claim the championship, while Rosberg had dropped out of title contention some races before). As it turned out, Prost won the race and the title, and a lap after Rosberg's retirement Mansell suffered the same fate as his former teammate, though in much more spectacular fashion.

Rosberg, who had made up his mind in mid-1984 that he would only race for two more years (but did not announce it publicly until Germany 1986), had no regrets about leaving Williams and joining McLaren at a time when the Honda engine was starting to come on strong, while the Porsche built TAG engine (and the 3 season old MP4/2) was starting to show its age. In an interview following his retirement announcement, Rosberg said that he was glad he left Williams when he did, stating that had he stayed with them he might have quit Formula One early in the 1986 season after Frank Williams' pre-season accident (in which he suffered a spinal cord injury which left him a tetraplegic) had left someone in a position of authority within the team who he said was one of the reasons he had decided to leave Williams, adding "We simply could not stand each other". While Rosberg did not name the person, it was generally believed to be Williams head designer and Technical Director Patrick Head, who had taken over the day-to-day running of the team while Frank Williams recovered from his accident.

After Formula One

In 1989 Rosberg made his comeback in the Spa 24 Hours in a Ferrari Mondial run by Moneytron (cf. Jean-Pierre Van Rossem and Onyx), the same team that gave Rosberg's protégé JJ Lehto his debut in Formula One. Rosberg was a key element of Peugeot's extremely competitive sportscar squad in the early 1990s. But after two years with the marque and varied successes (two victories and a failed attempt at the 24 Hours of Le Mans), he moved on to the German Touring Car Championship, the DTM, driving for Mercedes-Benz and Opel. Here he set up his own team, Team Rosberg, in 1995 and at the end of that year withdrew from driving to concentrate on running it.

Team Rosberg ran for another year in the DTM, until the series collapsed, and has been present in Formula BMW, German Formula Three, the Formula Three Euroseries and A1 GP since. Team Rosberg returned to the revived DTM in 2000, entering two Mercedes. Success, or even just scoring points, became harder with each passing season and Team Rosberg quit the series after their 2004 campaign, only to return in 2006, this time with Audi.

Manager of new talent
Rosberg later spent a long time managing his countrymen JJ Lehto and future world champion Mika Häkkinen. Until 2008, he also managed his son Nico who entered Formula One in 2006 driving for Williams F1. In 2013 he and Nico became the first father and son to both win at Monaco, 30 years apart from each other. In 2016, he and Nico became the second father son duo to both win Formula One World Championships, after Graham Hill and Damon Hill had won the Championships of 1962 & 1968 and 1996 respectively.

Helmet

In his karting years, Rosberg had a white helmet with a blue stripe, then, in Formula One, Sid Mosca (who designed helmets for Brazilian drivers including Ayrton Senna, Rubens Barrichello and Emerson Fittipaldi) painted Rosberg's helmet white with a blue circle on the top, and the stripe was divided into a large blue rectangle covering the visor area with some blue rectangles behind (similar to Didier Pironi's helmet design). In 1984, the rectangles were replaced by a yellow trapezium. His son Nico used a design that had similarities to Keke's helmet earlier in his Formula One career, with grey replacing blue and with flame motifs, before changing to a new design in 2014.

Racing record

Career summary

Complete European Formula Two Championship results
(key) (Races in bold indicate pole position; races in italics indicate fastest lap)

Complete Formula One World Championship results
(key) (Races in bold indicate pole position; races in italics indicate fastest lap)

† Did not finish, but was classified as he had completed more than 90% of the race distance.
‡ Race was stopped with less than 75% of laps completed, half points awarded.

Formula One non-championship results
(key) (Races in bold indicate pole position)
(Races in italics indicate fastest lap)

Complete World Sportscar Championship results
(key) (Races in bold indicate pole position) (Races in italics indicate fastest lap)

Complete 24 Hours of Le Mans results

Complete Deutsche Tourenwagen Meisterschaft results
(key) (Races in bold indicate pole position) (Races in italics indicate fastest lap)

Complete International Touring Car Championship results
(key) (Races in bold indicate pole position) (Races in italics indicate fastest lap)

In popular culture

In level 7 game 11 of the video game Angry Birds, created by the Finnish company Rovio, there is a caricature of Rosberg in a racing car sitting on the year "1982".

In 1985, renowned Finnish actor Matti Pellonpää and his band released a song called "".

In 2020, he appeared with his son Nico in a Heineken anti-drunk-driving ad.

References

External links
 
 Rosberg, Keijo (1948–). Kansallisbiografia. 
 Website about Keke Rosberg
 

1948 births
Living people
People from Solna Municipality
Finnish racing drivers
McLaren Formula One drivers
Williams Formula One drivers
Finnish Formula One drivers
ATS Wheels Formula One drivers
Theodore Formula One drivers
Fittipaldi Formula One drivers
Wolf Formula One drivers
Formula One World Drivers' Champions
Formula One race winners
European Formula Two Championship drivers
International Race of Champions drivers
Deutsche Tourenwagen Masters drivers
Atlantic Championship drivers
24 Hours of Le Mans drivers
Finnish expatriates in Sweden
World Sportscar Championship drivers
SCCA Formula Super Vee drivers
Formula Super Vee Champions
Sports car racing team owners
Peugeot Sport drivers
Mercedes-AMG Motorsport drivers
Team Rosberg drivers
Team Joest drivers